Puli Khumri, also spelled Pul-i-Khumri or Pol-e Khomri, is a district of Baghlan province, Afghanistan.

Demographics 
The population of the district was estimated to be around 191,640 in 2004. Tajiks are around 50% of the population and make up the majority in the district, followed by 30% Hazaras, 15% Pashtuns and 5% Uzbeks. The capital city is Puli Khumri.

See also
Baghlan

References

External links
AIMS District Map
District profile by the UNHCR (9 April 2002)

Districts of Baghlan Province